Pope Simplicius (died 2 or 10 March 483) was the bishop of Rome from 468 to his death. He combated the Eutychian heresy, ended the practice of consecrating bishops only in December, and sought to offset the effects of Germanic invasions.

Election

Simplicius was born in Tivoli, Italy, the son of a citizen named Castinus. After a vacancy of 10 days following the death of Pope Hilarius, Simplicius was consecrated on 25 February 468.

Pontificate
Simplicius defended the decisions of the Council of Chalcedon against the Eutychian heresy. When the Eutychians rose up in Antioch and installed Petrus Mongus, Simplicius made repeated complaints for action to Basiliscus and Leo I, emperors of the Eastern Roman Empire, for the restoration of the Catholic bishop; he did the same when Petrus Fullo usurped the seat of the patriarch of Alexandria. He rehabilitated Patriarch Timotheos Solofaciolus. In 478, Simplicius held a synod in Rome, which pronounced anathemas against eastern heretical bishops Peter Fullo, John of Apamea, and Paul of Ephesus. Simplicius worked to maintain the authority of Rome in the West. He named Zeno, Bishop of Hispalis (Seville) as Papal Vicar in Spain.

In 482, Bishop Gregory of Modena was consecrated a bishop against his will by Archbishop Joannes I of Ravenna. This brought the archbishop a sharp rebuke from Pope Simplicius.

According to the Carolingian liturgist Amalarius of Metz, Pope Simplicius was the first pope to carry out consecrations at any other time than in December before Christmas. He began to confer holy orders in February as well.

Simplicius is credited with the construction of a church named Santa Bibiana, in memory of the virgin and martyr St. Bibiana. He also dedicated the Church of San Stefano Rotondo on the Celian Hill, the church of S. Andrea near S. Maria Maggiore, and a church dedicated to Saint Lawrence in the Campo Verano. He labored to help the people of Italy against the marauding raids of barbarian invaders. He saw the Heruliian mercenaries revolt, depose Romulus Augustulus, the last emperor of the Western Roman Empire, and proclaim Odoacer king of Italy in 476. Odoacer made few changes in the administration in Rome, leaving the city firmly in the hands of its bishop, Simplicius.

Death and aftermath
He was buried in the Basilica of St. Peter on 2 March 483. Rome was without a pope for six days. Since 1971, St. Simplicius's feast day is celebrated on 10 March.

See also

List of Catholic saints
List of popes

References

Sources

Opera Omnia, edited by J.-P. Migne, Patrologia Latina, with analytical indexes. This link also holds the "Vita Operaque" section of the Liber Pontificalis.
Pennacchio, Maria Cristina (2000). "Simplicio, santo". Enciclopedia dei Papi (2000).  
"S. Simplicii papae Epistolae et decreta," in: 

 

5th-century births
483 deaths
People from Tivoli, Lazio
Popes
Italian popes
Italian saints
Papal saints
5th-century archbishops
5th-century Christian saints
5th-century Romans
Year of birth unknown
5th-century popes
Burials at St. Peter's Basilica